Data Protection Act may refer to:

 Data Protection Act, 2012 (Ghana)
 Data Protection Act 2018 (United Kingdom)
 The now-superseded Data Protection Act 1998 and Data Protection Act 1984 (United Kingdom)